Presidential elections were held in Rwanda on 19 December 1983. The country was a one-party state at the time, with the National Revolutionary Movement for Development (MRND) the sole legal party. Its leader, incumbent President Juvénal Habyarimana, who had taken power in the 1973 coup d'état, was the only candidate. The results showed 99.97% of votes in favour of his candidacy.

Results

References

Presidential elections in Rwanda
1983 in Rwanda
Single-candidate elections
One-party elections
Rwanda
Election and referendum articles with incomplete results